Until We Meet Again  (lit. The Red Thread) is 2019-2020 Thai BL television series starring Natouch Siripongthon (Fluke) and Thitiwat Ritprasert (Ohm). The series, directed by New Siwaj Sawatmaneekul, premiered in Thailand and aired from November 9, 2019 to March 1, 2020 with repeats on LINE TV. Based on The Red Thread ด้ายแดง by LazySheep.
The story is about two modern-day college students who discover that they are the reincarnated souls of two past lovers who had committed suicide. The series garnered much international attention, specifically in Southeast Asia and Latin America. On May 7, 2020, director New Siwaj Sawatmaneekul and author LazySheep confirmed that there will be a new series based on the side story for the characters Win and Team called "Between Us".

Synopsis 
Thirty years ago, Korn and Intouch were university students in Bangkok. Intouch entered Korn's life despite knowing that he was the son of one of the most influential people in Bangkok, the mafia. At first, Korn kept pushing Intouch away, but in the end, he couldn't resist the boy who was so full of life that he was the exact opposite and decided to let him into his heart. 
However, in a time when homosexuality was unacceptable and having parents were against their relationship and each other, Korn and In's love was bound to be doomed. Midst the chaos, while Intouch kept on fighting for their future, Korn could not deal with all his lover's suffering and decided to give up. That day, two sounds of a gunshot rang through the air. 
Their story ended with tragedy, but something had already tied itself between them, bounding them together even after they were dead. 
Years later, a freshly returned to Thailand, Pharm (19) who is a freshman at T- University has grown up always feeling like he is waiting for someone. Being riddled with sad dreams that always left him waking up with a wet face, fear of loud noises, and a birthmark on his temple, the boy has always felt like there is someone he is missing. Dean (21), the third-year swimming club president at T- University, has also spent his life searching for people whose faces he cannot remember. The red thread of fate that had tied them together in their past life once again pulls the two boys back to each other, tieing them to each other and a past that might not be worth remembering, but unforgettable love. Because the red thread that binds the two hearts together will always lead one back to the other. Even though it might tangle or stretch, it will never break.

Cast and characters

Main 
 Natouch Siripongthon (Fluke) as Pharm, a 19 year old freshman in college and an aspiring chef. He is the reincarnation of Intouch. He was reincarnated into Korn's family, Korn being his paternal uncle.
 Thitiwat Ritprasert (Ohm) as Dean, a third-year and the president of the swimming club. He is the reincarnation of Korn. He was reincarnated into Intouch's family, his mother is Intouch's niece and his grandmother is In's older sister.
 Katsamonnat Namwirote (Earth) as Intouch, Pharm's past self. He remains optimistic about his relationship with Korn even though he knows he is unhappy.
 Noppakao Dechaphatthanakun (Kao) as Korn, Dean's past self. His father is an important figure in the mafia, who expects Korn, the oldest, to take his place, despite Korn being against his father's work.

Supporting 
 Warut Chawalitrujiwong (Prem) as Team, Pharm's best friend and a member of the swimming club. He is often teased by Win, who he soon grows feelings for.
 Noppanut Guntachai (Boun) as Win, Dean's best friend and a member of the swimming club. He enjoys playing with Team, whom he has a crush on.
 Samantha Melanie Coates as Manaow, Pharm's and Team's best friend and a member of the drama club along with Del. She later dates Pruk.
 Supadach Wilairat (Bosston) as Pruk, a handsome swim club member and Manaow's love interest.
 Pannin Charnmanoon (Pineare) as Del, Dean's and Don's younger sister.
 Wanut Sangtianprapai (Mix) as Don, Dean's younger brother and Del's older brother.
 Phachara Suansri (Ja) as Sin, Pharm's cousin. He assists Dean in researching more about Korn and In.
 Naphat Vikairungroj (Na) as Sorn, Dean's friend and Sin's boyfriend.
 Songsit Roongnophakunsri as Mr. Wongnate, Dean's father.
 Sinjai Plengpanich as Alin, Dean's mother and Intouch's niece.
 Tarika Thidathit as An, In's older sister and Dean's grandmother.
 Savitree Suttichanond (Beau) as adult An.
 Ploy Sornarin as young An.
 Nirut Sirijanya as Mr. Ariyasakul, Korn's father.
 Phollawat Manuprasert as Krit, Korn's brother, Sin's father and Pharm's uncle.
 Kirati Puangmalee (Title) as young Krit.
 Phiravich Attachitsataporn (Mean) as Alex, a bisexual guy and the president of the Drama club, who makes a bunch of attempts to flirt with Pharm. 
 Surat Permpoonsavat (Yacht) as Mew, a swimming club member.

Guest role 
 Saranwut Chatjaratsaeng (Ball) as Phoom, Pharm's younger brother. 
 Tanapon Sukumpantanasan (Perth) as In's best friend.
 Vittawin Veeravidhayanant (Best) as Dej, a cooking club member.
 Rathavit Kijworalak (Plan) as one of Dean's business faculty friends. 
 Napat na Ranong (Gun) as another one of Dean's friends.

Soundtrack

References

External links
  on LINE TV

Thai boys' love television series
Thai comedy television series
2010s LGBT-related comedy television series
2020s LGBT-related comedy television series
2019 Thai television series debuts
2020 Thai television series endings